The 1959 NBA draft was the 13th annual draft of the National Basketball Association (NBA). The draft was held on March 31, 1959, before the 1959–60 season. In this draft, eight NBA teams took turns selecting amateur U.S. college basketball players. In each round, the teams select in reverse order of their win–loss record in the previous season. The draft consisted of 14 rounds comprising 85 players selected.

Draft selections and draftee career notes
Bob Boozer from Kansas State University was selected first overall by the Cincinnati Royals. Wilt Chamberlain and Bob Ferry were selected before the draft as Philadelphia Warriors' and St. Louis Hawks' territorial picks respectively. Although Chamberlain played at the University of Kansas, outside the territory of any NBA team, he was selected as the Warriors' territorial pick because the Warriors argued that Chamberlain had grown up in Philadelphia and played high school basketball at Overbrook High School in Philadelphia. The NBA agreed with the argument, hence making him the first territorial pick based solely on his pre-college roots. Chamberlain went on to win the Rookie of the Year Award and the Most Valuable Player Award in his first season. Two players from this draft, Wilt Chamberlain and Bailey Howell, have been inducted to the Basketball Hall of Fame.

Key

Draft

Trades
 Prior to the draft, the Detroit Pistons acquired Archie Dees along with the Cincinnati Royals' second-round pick, which was used to select Tom Robitaille, from the Royals in exchange for Phil Jordon.
 Prior to the draft, the St. Louis Hawks acquired the New York Knicks' second-round pick, which was used to select Alan Seiden, from the Knicks in exchange for Frank Selvy.

Notes

See also
 List of first overall NBA draft picks

References
General

Specific

External links
NBA.com
NBA.com: NBA Draft History

Draft
National Basketball Association draft
NBA draft
NBA draft
20th century in Cincinnati
Basketball in Cincinnati
Events in Cincinnati